The 1976 Pontins Professional was the third edition of the professional invitational snooker tournament which took place between 1 and 8 May 1976 in Prestatyn, Wales.

The tournament featured eight professional players. The quarter-final and semi-final matches were contested over the best of 13 frames, and the final was the best of 19 frames.

Ray Reardon won the event for the third time in a row, beating Fred Davis 10–9 in the final. He also made the highest break of the tournament, 123, in the seventh frame of the final.

Main draw

References

Pontins Professional
Snooker competitions in Wales
Pontins Professional
Pontins Professional
Pontins Professional